Medavie Blue Cross Stadium, formerly Moncton Stadium, is a track and field stadium on the campus of the Université de Moncton in Moncton, New Brunswick, Canada, built to host the IAAF 2010 World Junior Championships in Athletics. The $17 million venue opened in 2010.  Although seating capacity had fluctuated early in construction (original plans called for as many as 28,000 seats), the stadium has 8,300 permanent seats, and is expandable to 25,000 via temporary seating.  It is the home field for the Moncton Aigles Bleus soccer teams.

Construction
Construction by Acadian Construction began on April 22, 2009 and was completely finished in July 2010, just in time for the 2010 World Junior Championships in Athletics. Though the stadium was only completely finished in July, it was used on November 23, 2009 as the Vancouver 2010 Winter Olympic flame stayed there overnight.

The stadium was re-named to Stade Croix-Bleue Medavie Stadium on March 20, 2019 following a $1 million contribution by Medavie Blue Cross to support scholarships to student athletes in health science programs.

CFL events
The facility has also been proposed as a potential venue for a future Canadian Football League (CFL) expansion team, but a significant expansion to 25,000 seats would be recommended. CFL Commissioner Mark Cohon said he wanted to see "neutral-site" regular season games played in the new Moncton Stadium by 2010. On February 1, 2010, it was announced that the Toronto Argonauts would play host to the Edmonton Eskimos in an event dubbed "Touchdown Atlantic" that took place on September 26, 2010. On February 18, 2011, it was announced that the Hamilton Tiger-Cats would play host to the Calgary Stampeders in an event dubbed "Touchdown Atlantic 2" that took place on September 25, 2011. As every CFL stadium had an artificial surface until 2016 (the Argonauts began playing on natural grass at BMO Field in that year), the Touchdown Atlantic game had been the only CFL game played all season on a grass surface, although a temporary strip of artificial turf must be laid over the track in order to accommodate the end zones.

Other major events
The stadium plays host to numerous events during the year. Its state of the art track brings numerous track & field events to the stadium, including an annual youth competition for qualifying for the Canadian Youth Track and Field Championships. The stadium has also been used for university soccer games and has had the Olympic flame stay there overnight on November 23, 2009 during the torch relay for the 2010 Winter Olympics in Vancouver. During the Olympic flame's visit to Moncton, the attendance was only 12,000 due to the construction not being finished at the time.

On September 22, 2010 it was announced that the 2011, 2013, and 2015 Uteck Bowl would be played at Moncton Stadium due to the crumbling infrastructure of Huskies Stadium in Halifax, Nova Scotia. On November 12, 2012 it was announced that the AUS would cancel its Uteck Bowl partnership with the City of Moncton due to low attendance at the 2011 game.

On May 4, 2012 it was announced that Moncton would join Edmonton, Montreal, Ottawa, Vancouver, and Winnipeg in hosting the 2015 FIFA Women's World Cup, hosting 6 group stage matches and a round of 16 match. Moncton will also join Edmonton, Montreal and Toronto in hosting the 2014 FIFA U-20 Women's World Cup, hosting 6 group stage matches, a quarterfinal match and a semi-final match.

On May 20, 2016, it was announced on September 4, 2016, the stadium will host Atlantic Fest 2016 featuring Selena Gomez, DNCE, Flo Rida, Shawn Hook and Francesco Yates.

On February 21, 2023 it was announced that rock band Guns 'N' Rose's will be playing on August 5th, 2023 as part of their World Tour. The band will be made up of the original band members.

Turf controversy
In order to host matches for the 2015 FIFA Women's World Cup, the stadium was required to remove the grass surface and replace it with artificial turf. The stadium paid $1.5 million for the conversion to FieldTurf and is paying an additional $500,000 to create a new grass surface adjacent to the stadium for use where the turf surface cannot be used due to safety concerns, such as Paralympic Track-and-field, prompting allegations of discrimination against Paralympic athletes.

A coalition of elite female players from around the world filed a lawsuit challenging FIFA’s decision to play the 2015 Women’s World Cup on artificial turf.  Alleging gender discrimination, the lawsuit states that they would never have the Men's World Cup held on "unsafe" artificial turf and thus violates the Canadian Human Rights Act.

See also
 List of Canadian Premier League stadiums
List of entertainment events in Greater Moncton
2010 World Junior Championships in Athletics
Canadian Football League
Moncton Sport Facilities
Université de Moncton
Touchdown Atlantic
Uteck Bowl

References

Sports venues in Moncton
Athletics (track and field) venues in Canada
Canadian Football League venues
Multi-purpose stadiums in Canada
Université de Moncton
2010 establishments in New Brunswick
Sports venues completed in 2010
Soccer venues in New Brunswick
2015 FIFA Women's World Cup stadiums